Brookston is a town in Prairie Township, White County, in the U.S. state of Indiana. The population was 1,554 as of the 2010 United States Census.

History
Brookston was platted in 1853, and named for James Brooks, a railroad official.

The Brookston post office has been in operation since the town was platted.

Geography
Brookston is located at  (40.601167, -86.865803).

Demographics

2010 census
As of the 2010 United States Census, there were 1,554 people, 624 households, and 430 families in the town. The racial makeup of the town was 98.0% White, 0.1% Native American, 0.2% Asian, 0.1% Pacific Islander, 0.5% from other races, and 1.2% from two or more races. Hispanic or Latino of any race were 2.6% of the population.

There were 624 households, of which 34.8% had children under the age of 18 living with them, 50.8% were married couples living together, 11.4% had a female householder with no husband present, 6.7% had a male householder with no wife present, and 31.1% were non-families. 26.1% of all households were made up of individuals, and 11.2% had someone living alone who was 65 years of age or older. The average household size was 2.49 and the average family size was 2.97.

The median age in the town was 37.6 years. 26.6% of residents were under the age of 18; 7% were between the ages of 18 and 24; 26.8% were from 25 to 44; 27.8% were from 45 to 64; and 11.9% were 65 years of age or older. The gender makeup of the town was 46.4% male and 53.6% female.

Jordan Allen also lives here

2000 census
As of the 2000 United States Census, there were 1,717 people, 691 households, and 503 families in the town. The racial makeup of the town was 98.89% White, 0.06% African American, 0.17% Native American, 0.17% Asian, 0.17% from other races, and 0.52% from two or more races. Hispanic or Latino of any race were 1.46% of the population.

There were 691 households, out of which 36.3% had children under the age of 18 living with them, 55.0% were married couples living together, 13.2% had a female householder with no husband present, and 27.2% were non-families. 23.2% of all households were made up of individuals, and 11.6% had someone living alone who was 65 years of age or older. The average household size was 2.48 and the average family size was 2.91.

The town population contained 28.1% under the age of 18, 6.1% from 18 to 24, 31.0% from 25 to 44, 22.9% from 45 to 64, and 11.8% who were 65 years of age or older. The median age was 36 years. For every 100 females there were 89.7 males. For every 100 females age 18 and over, there were 82.3 males.

The median income for a household in the town was $41,422, and the median income for a family was $47,011. Males had a median income of $35,645 versus $22,891 for females. The per capita income for the town was $18,291. About 4.0% of families and 5.2% of the population were below the poverty line, including 6.1% of those under age 18 and 5.7% of those age 65 or over.

Education
The town has a lending library, the Brookston-Prairie Township Public Library.
Frontier Elementary School is a K-6 school. The Jr-Sr High school is located in Chalmers, 2.4 miles (3.8 km) north of Brookston.

Arts and culture
Since 1978 the town has held an annual Brookston Apple Popcorn Festival, on the third Saturday in September. The festival features food and cakes, musical entertainment, contests, races, vendor booths and yard sales.

Brookston is home to Jim Riley, whose agriculture market commentary was featured on the "Hoosier Ag Today" program through 2015.

See also
 Meadow Lake Wind Farm

References

Towns in White County, Indiana